Luiz Eduardo may refer to:

 Luiz Eduardo (footballer, born 1985), Luiz Eduardo Azevedo Dantas, Brazilian football forward
 Luiz Eduardo (footballer, born 1987), Luiz Eduardo Rodrigues, Brazilian football centre-back
 Luiz Eduardo (footballer, born 1993), Luiz Eduardo Felix da Costa, Brazilian football centre-back